Lars Hansen may refer to:
 Lars Hansen (basketball) (born 1954), retired Danish-Canadian basketball player
 Lars Peter Hansen (born 1952), economist and Nobel laureate

See also
 Lars Hanson (1886–1965), Swedish actor
 Lars Hanssen (chess player) (1903–1940), Norwegian chess player